Jungle girl is an archetype or stock character of a female adventurer or superhero or even a damsel in distress living in a jungle or rainforest setting.

Jungle Girl may also refer to:
Ro Cham Phoeung labeled by the media as a Jungle Girl was found after purportedly being missing for 19 years in a Cambodian jungle
Bindi the Jungle Girl, a 2007 Discovery Channel television show featuring Bindi Irwin
Jungle Girl (novel), a 1932 Edgar Rice Burroughs novel
Jungle Girl (serial), a 1941 movie serial based on the novel
Jungle Girl (Dynamite Entertainment), comic character from Dynamite Entertainment

See also 
 Cave Girl (disambiguation)
 Sabine Kuegler, writer of Jungle Child, about her experiences in West Papua (New Guinea island) and Europe